Dongshanocaris is genus of Cambrian arthropod known for being a member of the Chengjiang biota, containing the single species D. foliiformis. It was described by Hou and Bergstrom in 1999. In 2013 Oxford University fellow David Legg described it as "too poorly preserved to verify their identity as a valid taxa".

See also

 Cambrian explosion
 List of Chengjiang Biota species by phylum

References

Cambrian animals
Maotianshan shales fossils
Prehistoric arthropod genera

Cambrian genus extinctions